Ulisses Alexandre Garcia Lopes (born 11 January 1996) is a professional footballer who plays as a left-back for Swiss Super League club Young Boys. Born in Portugal, he represents the Switzerland national team.

Club career

Early career
Garcia is a youth exponent from Grasshopper Club Zürich. He made his Swiss Super League debut at 18 May 2014 against FC Sion. He played the full game, which ended in a 3–1 defeat in Sion.

Werder Bremen
On 26 May 2015, Werder Bremen announced their signing of Garcia. Garcia joined the Bundesliga club on a three-year contract. With Santiago García recovering from a long-standing injury, Ulisses Garcia went into the season as first-choice left back ahead of Janek Sternberg. Upon Santiago García's return, Ulisses Garcia was mostly deployed in left midfield.

Young Boys
In June 2018, Garcia joined Swiss Super League side BSC Young Boys on a four-year contract. The transfer fee paid to Werder Bremen was reported as €800,000.

International career
Born in Portugal to parents of Cape Verdean descent and raised in Switzerland, Garcia is eligible for all three countries. However, he has appeared exclusively for Switzerland in youth international, with seven appearances for the Swiss U19s, 17 with the U21 team.

He was first called up to the Switzerland national football team in June 2017 for games against Belarus and Faroe Islands, but did not play. He made his debut on 1 September 2021 in a friendly against Greece, a 2–1 home victory. He substituted Silvan Widmer at half-time.

Career statistics

Club

Honours 
Young Boys
 Swiss Super League: 2018–19, 2019–20
 Swiss Cup: 2019–20
Individual
Swiss Super League Team of the Year: 2018–19, 2020–21

References

External links
 

1996 births
Living people
Sportspeople from Almada
Association football fullbacks
Swiss men's footballers
Switzerland youth international footballers
Switzerland under-21 international footballers
Switzerland international footballers
Portuguese footballers
Swiss people of Cape Verdean descent
Swiss sportspeople of African descent
Portuguese people of Cape Verdean descent
Swiss Super League players
Bundesliga players
2. Bundesliga players
3. Liga players
Grasshopper Club Zürich players
SV Werder Bremen players
SV Werder Bremen II players
1. FC Nürnberg players
BSC Young Boys players
Swiss expatriate footballers
Swiss expatriate sportspeople in Germany
Expatriate footballers in Germany